Anna Lownes (December 19, 1842 – January 4, 1910), (active 1884–1905) was an American painter of still lifes.

She was born in Delaware County, Pennsylvania to Phineas Lownes and Emily Lewis, a niece of manufacturer and philanthropist John Price Crozer. Lownes studied at the Philadelphia School of Design for Women and at the Académie Delécluse in Paris. She was a pupil of Milne Ramsey. She exhibited work at the Pennsylvania Academy of the Fine Arts and National Academy of Design; from 1885 to 1887 catalogs gave her address as Media, Pennsylvania, but in later years she was said to have moved to 1708 Chestnut Street, Philadelphia.

Lownes exhibited her work at the Palace of Fine Arts and The Woman's Building at the 1893 World's Columbian Exposition in Chicago, Illinois. A Study of Apples dated to before 1890 was included in the inaugural exhibition of the National Museum of Women in the Arts, American Women Artists 1830-1930, in 1987.

References

19th-century American painters
19th-century American women artists
20th-century American painters
20th-century American women artists
American women painters
American still life painters
People from Media, Pennsylvania
Artists from Philadelphia
Painters from Pennsylvania
Philadelphia School of Design for Women alumni
Académie Delécluse alumni
1842 births
1910 deaths